The German Basketball Federation (abbreviated as DBB), is the governing body for basketball in Germany. It is headquartered in Hagen, Germany.

Competitions

The DBB also organizes several competitions:
 Men's competitions:
 Basketball Bundesliga
 ProA
 ProB
 BBL-Pokal
 BBL Champions Cup (inactive)
 Women's competitions:
 Damen-Basketball-Bundesliga
 Deutscher Pokalsieger
 German Supercup

History
The predecessor of the German Basketball Federation, called the "Society for the Promotion of Basketball", was founded in 1947. The German Basketball Federation itself was then was founded on 1 October 1949, in Düsseldorf, Germany. Siegfried Reiner was the German Basketball Federation's first chairman.

Presidents

Broadcasting rights
The German Basketball Federation games will stream on Bleacher Report Live in the United States.

See also 
Germany men's national basketball team
Germany men's national under-20 basketball team
Germany men's national under-19 basketball team
Germany men's national under-17 basketball team
Germany men's national 3x3 team
Germany women's national basketball team
Germany women's national under-20 basketball team
Germany women's national under-19 basketball team
Germany women's national under-17 basketball team
Germany women's national 3x3 team

References

External links
Official website 
Germany FIBA profile  

Basketball in Germany
Basketball governing bodies in Europe
Basketball
Sports organizations established in 1949
Sport in Hagen